R396 road may refer to:
 R396 road (Ireland)
 R396 road (South Africa)